Strážov may refer to:

 Strážov (Klatovy District), a town in the Czech Republic
 Strážov (Slovakia), a hill in Karpaty